Gangseo-gu Office Station is a station of the Busan Metro Line 3 in Daejeo-dong, Gangseo District, Busan, South Korea.

External links

  Cyber station information from Busan Transportation Corporation

Busan Metro stations
Gangseo District, Busan
Railway stations opened in 2005